Laila Siddiqui is a Bangladesh Awami League politician and the former Member of Parliament from Tangail-4.

Career
Siddiqui was elected to parliament from Tangail-4 in 1988. She was one of the Bangladesh Awami League leaders who received 100 Bangladesh Nationalist Party men in the league in Tangail on 11 January 2007. She sued the government on 11 January 2014, after her husband Abdul Latif Siddiqui was arrested for criticizing Hajj and Tablighi Jamaat in New York City. She argued that cases against her husband were unconstitutional because, for offences committed outside Bangladesh, Bangladeshi law requires permission of the home minister before individuals can be charged.

Personal life
Siddiqui is married to Abdul Latif Siddiqui, former minister and a member of parliament.

References

Living people
Awami League politicians
Year of birth missing (living people)
Place of birth missing (living people)
Women members of the Jatiya Sangsad
4th Jatiya Sangsad members
3rd Jatiya Sangsad members